Boxirhat railway station serves the areas of Bakshirhat lying in Cooch Behar district in the Indian state of West Bengal. The station lies in New Cooch Behar-Golokganj branch line under Alipurduar railway division of Northeast Frontier Railway zone.

References

Alipurduar railway division
Railway stations in West Bengal